The 2020 Minnesota Twins season  was the 60th season for the Minnesota Twins franchise in the Twin Cities of Minnesota, their 11th season at Target Field and the 120th overall in the American League.  It was the team's second year under manager Rocco Baldelli.

On March 12, 2020, MLB announced that because of the ongoing COVID-19 pandemic, the start of the regular season would be delayed by at least two weeks in addition to the remainder of spring training being cancelled. Four days later, it was announced that the start of the season would be pushed back indefinitely due to the recommendation made by the CDC to restrict events of more than 50 people for eight weeks. On June 23, commissioner Rob Manfred unilaterally implemented a 60-game season. Players reported to training camps on July 1 in order to resume spring training and prepare for a July 24 Opening Day. On the last day of the shortened 2020 season, the Twins clinched the American League Central division title for the second year in a row thanks to a loss by the Chicago White Sox. On September 29, the Twins lost Game One of the 2020 American League Wild Card Series to the Houston Astros. The game was their seventeenth consecutive postseason loss, which broke the record for the longest postseason losing streak in North American sports, passing the 1975-79 Chicago Blackhawks. The Twins were ultimately swept two games to zero in the best-of-three series, extending their record-breaking losing streak to eighteen games.

Season standings

Records vs. Opponents

Game log

Regular season

|- style="background:#cfc;"
| 1 || July 24 || @ White Sox || 10–5 || May (1–0) || Giolito (0–1) || — || 1–0 || W1
|- style="background:#fbb;"
| 2 || July 25 || @ White Sox || 3–10 || Keuchel (1–0) || Dobnak (0–1) || — || 1–1 || L1
|- style="background:#cfc;"
| 3 || July 26 || @ White Sox || 14–2 || Maeda (1–0) || López (0–1) || — || 2–1 || W1
|- style="background:#cfc;"
| 4 || July 28 || Cardinals || 6–3 || Bailey (1–0) || Martínez (0–1) || Romo (1) || 3–1 || W2
|- style="background:#cfc;"
| 5 || July 29 || Cardinals || 3–0 || Hill (1–0) || Ponce de Leon (0–1) || Rogers (1) || 4–1 || W3
|- style="background:#fbb;"
| 6 || July 30 || Indians || 0–2 || Bieber (2–0) || Berríos (0–1) || Karinchak (1) || 4–2 || L1
|- style="background:#cfc;"
| 7 || July 31 || Indians || 4–1 || Dobnak (1–1) || Clevinger (0–1) || Rogers (2) || 5–2 || W1
|-

|- style="background:#cfc;"
| 8 || August 1 || Indians || 3–0 || Maeda (2–0) || Carrasco (1–1) || Rogers (3) || 6–2 || W2
|- style="background:#cfc;"
| 9 || August 2 || Indians || 3–1 || Smeltzer (1–0) || Civale (1–1) || Romo (2) || 7–2 || W3
|- style="background:#cfc;"
| 10 || August 3 || Pirates || 5–4 || Rogers (1–0) || Burdi (0–1) || — || 8–2 || W4 
|- style="background:#cfc;"
| 11 || August 4 || Pirates || 7–3 || Berríos (1–1) || Musgrove (0–3) || May (1) || 9–2 || W5
|- style="background:#cfc;"
| 12 || August 5 || @ Pirates || 5–2 || Dobnak (2–1) || Williams (0–3) || — || 10–2 || W6
|- style="background:#fbb;"
| 13 || August 6 || @ Pirates || 5–6 || Howard (1–0) || Rogers (1–1) || — || 10–3 || L1
|- style="background:#fbb;"
| 14 || August 7 || @ Royals || 2–3 || Holland (2–0) || Wisler (0–1) || Rosenthal (2) || 10–4 || L2
|- style="background:#fbb;"
| 15 || August 8 || @ Royals || 6–9 || Zuber (1–1) || Thorpe (0–1) || Rosenthal (3) || 10–5 || L3
|- style="background:#fbb;"
| 16 || August 9 || @ Royals || 2–4 || Singer (1–1) || Berríos (1–2) || Barlow (1) || 10–6 || L4
|- style="background:#cfc;"
| 17 || August 10 || @ Brewers || 4–2 || Dobnak (3–1) || Houser (1–1) || Rogers (4) || 11–6 || W1
|- style="background:#fbb;"
| 18 || August 11 || @ Brewers || 4–6 || Williams (1–1) || Rogers (1–2) || Hader (3) || 11–7 || L1
|- style="background:#cfc;"
| 19 || August 12 || @ Brewers || 12–2 || Maeda (3–0) || Lauer (0–2) || — || 12–7 || W1
|- style="background:#cfc;"
| 20 || August 15  || Royals || 4–2  || Duffey (1–0) || Speier (0–1) || Rogers (5) || 13–7 || W2
|- style="background:#fbb;"
| 21 || August 15  || Royals || 2–4  || Duffy (1–2) || Berríos (1–3) || Rosenthal (5) || 13–8 || L1
|- style="background:#cfc;"
| 22 || August 16 || Royals || 4–2 || Dobnak (4–1) || Singer (1–2) || Romo (3) || 14–8 || W1
|- style="background:#cfc;"
| 23 || August 17 || Royals || 4–1 || Smeltzer (2–0) || Bubic (0–3) || — || 15–8 || W2
|- style="background:#cfc;"
| 24 || August 18 || Brewers || 4–3  || Alcalá (1–0) || Phelps (2–2) || — || 16–8 || W3
|- style="background:#fbb;"
| 25 || August 19 || Brewers || 3–9 || Anderson (1–2) || Hill (1–1) || — || 16–9 || L1
|- style="background:#cfc;"
| 26 || August 20 || Brewers || 7–1 || Berríos (2–3) || Woodruff (1–2) || — || 17–9 || W1
|- style="background:#fbb;"
| 27 || August 21 || @ Royals || 2–7 || Duffy (2–2) || Odorizzi (0–1) || — || 17–10 || L1
|- style="background:#cfc;"
| 28 || August 22 || @ Royals || 7–2 || Dobnak (5–1) || Singer (1–3) || — || 18–10 || W1
|- style="background:#cfc;"
| 29 || August 23 || @ Royals || 5–4 || Clippard (1–0) || Bubic (0–4) || Rogers (6) || 19–10 || W2
|- style="background:#cfc;"
| 30 || August 24 || @ Indians || 3–2 || Maeda (4–0) || Civale (3–3) || Rogers (7) || 20–10 || W3
|- style="background:#fbb;"
| 31 || August 25 || @ Indians || 2–4 || Bieber (6–0) || Alcalá (1–1) || Hand (8) || 20–11 || L1
|- style="background:#fbb;"
| 32 || August 26 || @ Indians || 3–6 || Maton (2–0) || Romo (0–1) || Hand (9) || 20–12 || L2
|- bgcolor="bbbbbb"
| — || August 27 || @ Tigers || colspan=7 | Postponed (strikes due to shooting of Jacob Blake); Rescheduled to August 28 
|- style="background:#bbb;"
| — || August 28  || @ Tigers || colspan=7 | Postponed (rain); Rescheduled to August 29 
|- style="background:#bbb;"
| — || August 28  || @ Tigers || colspan=7 | Postponed (rain); Rescheduled to September 4 
|- style="background:#fbb;"
| 33 || August 29  || @ Tigers || 2–8  || Boyd (1–4) || Dobnak (5–2) || — || 20–13 || L3
|- style="background:#fbb;"
| 34 || August 29  || @ Tigers || 2–4  || Skubal (1–1) || Duffey (1–1) || Soto (1) || 20–14 || L4
|- style="background:#fbb;"
| 35 || August 30 || @ Tigers || 2–3 || Alexander (2–1) || Maeda (4–1) || Soto (2) || 20–15 || L5
|- style="background:#fbb;"
| 36 || August 31 || White Sox || 5–8 || Foster (4–0) || Rogers (1–3) || Colomé (7) || 20–16 || L6
|-

|- style="background:#cfc;"
| 37 || September 1 || White Sox || 3–2 || Thielbar (1–0) || Cordero (0–2) || Wisler (1) || 21–16 || W1
|- style="background:#cfc;"
| 38 || September 2 || White Sox || 8–1 || Berríos (3–3) || López (0–2) || — || 22–16 || W2
|- style="background:#cfc;"
| 39 || September 4  || Tigers || 2–0  || Dobnak (6–2) || Boyd (1–5) || Rogers (8) || 23–16 || W3
|- style="background:#cfc;"
| 40 || September 4  || Tigers  || 3–2  || Romo (1–1) || Jiménez (1–3) || May (2) || 24–16 || W4
|- style="background:#cfc;"
| 41 || September 5 || Tigers || 4–3 || Alcalá (2–1) || Cisnero (1–2) || — || 25–16 || W5
|- style="background:#fbb;"
| 42 || September 6 || Tigers || 8–10 || Funkhouser (1–1) || Romo (1–2) || Garcia (1) || 25–17 || L1
|- style="background:#cfc;"
| 43 || September 7 || Tigers || 6–2 || Pineda (1–0) || Fulmer (0–1) || — || 26–17 || W1
|- style="background:#cfc;"
| 44 || September 8 || @ Cardinals || 7–3  || Berríos (4–3) || Martínez (0–2) || — || 27–17 || W2
|- style="background:#fbb;"
| 45 || September 8 || @ Cardinals || 4–6  || Cabrera (3–1) || Dobnak (6–3) || Gallegos (4) || 27–18 || L1
|- style="background:#cfc;"
| 46 || September 11 || Indians || 3–1 || Maeda (5–1) || Bieber (7–1) || Rogers (9) || 28–18 || W1
|- style="background:#cfc;"
| 47 || September 12 || Indians || 8–4 || Hill (2–1) || Plesac (3–2) || — || 29–18 || W2
|- style="background:#cfc;"
| 48 || September 13 || Indians || 7–5 || Thielbar (2–0) || McKenzie (2–1) || Romo (4) || 30–18 || W3
|- style="background:#fbb;"
| 49 || September 14 || @ White Sox || 1–3 || Colomé (2–0) || Rogers (1–4) || — || 30–19 || L1
|- style="background:#fbb;"
| 50 || September 15 || @ White Sox || 2–6 || Dunning (2–0) || Dobnak (6–4) || — || 30–20 || L2
|- style="background:#cfc;"
| 51 || September 16 || @ White Sox || 5–1 || Stashak (1–0) || Giolito (4–3) || — || 31–20 || W1
|- style="background:#fbb;"
| 52 || September 17 || @ White Sox || 3–4 || Heuer (3–0) || Clippard (1–1) || Colomé (12) || 31–21 || L1
|- style="background:#fbb;"
| 53 || September 18 || @ Cubs || 0–1 || Hendricks (6–4) || Hill (2–2) || Jeffress (8) || 31–22 || L2
|- style="background:#cfc;"
| 54 || September 19 || @ Cubs || 8–1 || Pineda (2–0) || Mills (5–4) || — || 32–22 || W1 
|- style="background:#cfc;"
| 55 || September 20 || @ Cubs || 4–0 || Berríos (5–3) || Darvish (7–3) || — || 33–22 || W2
|- style="background:#cfc;"
| 56 || September 22 || Tigers || 5–4  || Rogers (2–4) || Garcia (2–1) || — || 34–22 || W3
|- style="background:#cfc;"
| 57 || September 23 || Tigers || 7–6 || Maeda (6–1) || Mize (0–3) || — || 35–22 || W4
|- style="background:#fbb;"
| 58 || September 25 || Reds || 2–7 || Lorenzen (3–1) || Berríos (5–4) || — || 35–23 || L1
|- style="background:#cfc;"
| 59 || September 26 || Reds || 7–3 || Clippard (2–1) || Castillo (4–6) || — || 36–23 || W1
|- style="background: #fbb;"
| 60 || September 27 || Reds || 3–5 ||Iglesias (4–3)|| Thielbar (2–1)|| — || 36–24|| L1
|-

|- style="text-align:center;"
| Legend:       = Win       = Loss       = PostponementBold = Twins team memberNotes:  The Tigers are designated the home team for the makeup game from August 28.

Postseason

|- style=background:#fbb;"
| 1 || September 29 || Astros || 1–4 || Valdez (1–0) || Romo (0–1) || — || 0–1 || L1
|- style=background:#fbb;"
| 2 || September 30 || Astros || 1–3 || Javier (1–0) || Stashak' (0–2) || Pressly (1) || 0–2 || L2
|-

Postseason rosters

| style="text-align:left" | 
Pitchers: 12 Jake Odorizzi 17 José Berríos 18 Kenta Maeda 21 Tyler Duffey 35 Michael Pineda 36 Tyler Clippard 37 Matt Wisler 54 Sergio Romo 55 Taylor Rogers 61 Cody Stashak 65 Trevor May 68 Randy Dobnak 72 Caleb Thielbar 
Catchers: 8 Mitch Garver 16 Alex Avila 39 Ryan Jeffers 64 Willians Astudillo 
Infielders: 2 Luis Arráez 9 Marwin González 11 Jorge Polanco 13 Ehire Adrianza 22 Miguel Sanó 
Outfielders: 20 Eddie Rosario 25 Byron Buxton 26 Max Kepler 76 Alex Kirilloff 
Designated hitters: 23 Nelson Cruz 
|- valign="top"

Roster

Farm system

References

External links
2020 Minnesota Twins season at Baseball Reference''

2020
2020 Major League Baseball season
2020 in sports in Minnesota
2020